Tạ Chí Đại Trường, also Trần Trường Thanh (21 June 1938 – 24 March 2016), was a Vietnamese historian. Tạ Chí Đại Trường graduated from the University of Saigon with an MA in history in 1964 then taught history in Vietnam and published Lịch Sử Nội Chiến Việt Nam 1771-1802 (Saigon 1973), before being enrolled in the South Vietnamese Army. He remained in Vietnam after the fall of Saigon in 1975, and was sent to a re-education camp. He emigrated to the United States in 1994.

Together with Liam C. Kelley he criticised the authenticity of the Hùng kings claiming that they were later invented and that their supposed historicity had no basis in reality. Tạ Chí Đại Trường claimed that the government of the Socialist Republic of Vietnam was unwilling to challenge the current narrative of the Hùng kings because of the adulation that the country had received in light of the Vietnam War by foreigners that admired the Communists' struggle that caused it to promote the previously vague myth of the Hùng kings to become a national legend taught unquestionably to the Vietnamese people as it's a powerful origin myth, making any critical discussion about the Hồng Bàng dynasty tense.

References 

20th-century Vietnamese historians
1938 births
2016 deaths
21st-century Vietnamese historians